{{DISPLAYTITLE:N4O}}
The molecular formula N4O (molar mass: 72.03 g/mol, exact mass: 72.0072 u) may refer to:

 Nitrosylazide
 Oxatetrazole

See also
 Dinitrogen tetroxide

Inorganic molecular formulas